Camellocossus henleyi is a moth in the family Cossidae. It is found in Algeria, Morocco, Egypt, Ethiopia, Mauritania, Sudan and possibly Namibia.

The larvae feed on Acacia nilotica and Acacia raddiana.

References

Natural History Museum Lepidoptera generic names catalog

Cossinae
Moths described in 1905
Moths of Africa